Lost Creek is a tributary of the Koshin River in northwest part of the province of British Columbia, Canada. Lost Creek's watershed's land cover is classified as 46.3% shrubland, 31.5% conifer forest, 12.2% barren, and small amounts of other cover.

Lost Creek is in the traditional territory of the Tlingit Taku River Tlingit First Nation and the Tahltan First Nation, of the Tahltan people.

Geography
The creek flows north and northwest, first through Level Mountain's high and relatively barren lava plateau, then through rugged forested terrain. In its final  Lost Creek enters the Koshin River's floodplain. It empties into the Koshin River in the wetlands along the river north of Hatin Lake. The historic Yukon Telegraph Trail, following the Koshin River, crosses Lost Creek near its mouth.

See also
List of British Columbia rivers

References

External links
 

Cassiar Land District
Level Mountain
Nahlin Plateau
Rivers of British Columbia
Stikine Country
Tahltan
Tlingit